Sarny: A Life Remembered is the sequel to Nightjohn by Gary Paulsen. It was published on September 8, 1997 by Dell Books.

Novels by Gary Paulsen
1997 American novels
Novels about American slavery
Novels set in New Orleans